Iscah ( Yīskā) is the daughter of Haran and the niece of Abraham in the Book of Genesis. The passage in which Iscah is mentioned is extremely brief. As a result rabbinical scholars have developed theories to explain it, typically adopting the claim that Iscah was an alternate name for Sarah (Sarai), the wife of Abraham, particularly that it denoted her role as a prophetess.

The Babylonian Talmud connects the name Iscah to an Aramaic verbal rooting, meaning "to see". It connects the name with prophetic foresight. Modern scholars are not convinced by the Talmud's explanation, and Iscah's etymology is currently regarded as uncertain.

"Iscah" is also believed to be the source of the name "Jessica", via a character in William Shakespeare's play The Merchant of Venice.

Biblical text
The only reference to Iscah is in a brief passage in the Book of Genesis:

And Abram and Nahor took them wives: the name of Abram's wife [was] Sarai; and the name of Nahor's wife, Milcah, who is the daughter of Haran, who is also the father of Iscah.
—  KJV

Rabbinical interpretation
Since Haran is described as the father of both Iscah and Milcah, Rabbinical scholars concluded that Iscah was another name or title for Sarai. This was formulated in the Targum Pseudo-Yonathan. Howard Schwartz explains:

Rabbi Isaac commented "Iscah was Sarah, and why was she called Iscah? Because she foresaw the future by divine inspiration." Schwarz describes Iscah as an "extension of Sarah's personality beyond its normal bounds".

Modern views
Historian Savina J. Teubal takes the view that the name of Iscah was probably included in the text of Genesis because Iscah represented an important genealogy:

Jessica
The name "Jessica" comes from a character in Shakespeare's play The Merchant of Venice, the daughter of Shylock. Iscah was supposedly rendered "Jeska" in some English Bibles available in Shakespeare's day, although the Tyndale Bible has "Iisca" as does the Coverdale Bible, the Geneva Bible has "Iscah", and the earlier Wycliffe Bible has "Jescha". The Matthew Bible (1537) has "Iesca".

References

Book of Genesis people
Noach (parashah)
Women in the Hebrew Bible